Timothy DeShawn Jennings (born December 24, 1983) is a former American football cornerback. He played college football at Georgia, and was drafted by the Indianapolis Colts in the second round of the 2006 NFL Draft.

Jennings has also played for the Chicago Bears and Tampa Bay Buccaneers. With the Colts, he won Super Bowl XLI against the Bears.

Professional career

Indianapolis Colts (2006–2009)
Jennings was drafted by the  Indianapolis Colts in the 2006 NFL Draft, and was a member of the Super Bowl XLI Champion team as a rookie. From 2006-2009, Jennings recorded four interceptions and played in 53 games.

Chicago Bears (2010–2015)

2010
Jennings signed with the Chicago Bears in free agency and earned a starting position in coach Lovie Smith's defense. In 2010 against the Buffalo Bills, Jennings returned an interception for a touchdown to lead the Bears a 22–19 victory.

Jennings was part of the team that advanced to the 2010 NFC Championship Game, ultimately falling just short of a berth in Super Bowl XLV.

2011
During a middling 2011 season, Jennings was benched by the Bears coaching staff after a poor game against the Seattle Seahawks in Week 15. However, Jennings rebounded and eventually developed into one of the best cover corners in the NFL. During his time in Chicago, Jennings and hard-hitting Charles Tillman formed one of the best cornerback tandems in the league.

2012
On March 2012, Jennings was re-signed to a 2-year contract, and was later reunited with former Colts teammate Kelvin Hayden. Against his former team in the season opener, Jennings intercepted first-overall draft pick Andrew Luck twice, marking the first time in Jennings' career that he recorded two interceptions in a single game. He also forced another interception by deflecting Luck's pass to safety Chris Conte. The following week, Jennings recorded five tackles, two passes defended, and intercepted Aaron Rodgers in a 23–10 loss to the Packers. After week three of the 2012 season against the St. Louis Rams, Jennings became the first Bears player to record an interception in four consecutive games (dating back to the 2011 season finale) since Dave Duerson in 1986. Jennings was later named the NFC Defensive Player of the Month for September. His seven interceptions led the NFL. In Week 13 against the Seattle Seahawks, Jennings sustained a shoulder injury, and was ruled out of the following game against the Minnesota Vikings. Jennings was replaced by former Colts teammate Kelvin Hayden. As of Week 16, Jennings led the Bears with 15 pass breakups, and his three games with more than one interception is a team record. On December 26, Jennings was named to his first career Pro Bowl. Jennings was later named to the second team of the 2012 All-Pro Team, his first.

2013
In 2013, Jennings recorded  a team-leading four interceptions, the second-most in his career, behind 2012's nine interceptions. In the past two seasons, Jennings has recorded 13 interceptions, the second-most in the league behind Richard Sherman's 16. Jennings was an unrestricted free agent for the 2014 season until January 2, 2014, when he was re-signed by the Bears to a 4-year contract. On January 20, 2014, Jennings was named to the Pro Bowl roster to replace Richard Sherman, becoming the second Bears cornerback to make two consecutive Pro Bowls, after Tillman in 2011–12.

2015
On August 30, 2015, Jennings was released by the Bears.

Tampa Bay Buccaneers (2015)
Jennings signed with the Buccaneers on September 3, 2015. Jennings was released from the Buccaneers on November 9, 2015.

Personal life
Jennings is the younger cousin of former NFL cornerback Donnie Abraham.

References

External links

Chicago Bears bio

1983 births
Living people
People from Orangeburg, South Carolina
Players of American football from South Carolina
African-American players of American football
American football cornerbacks
Georgia Bulldogs football players
Indianapolis Colts players
Chicago Bears players
Tampa Bay Buccaneers players
National Conference Pro Bowl players
Unconferenced Pro Bowl players
Orangeburg-Wilkinson High School alumni
21st-century African-American sportspeople
20th-century African-American people